Robert LeRoy Sampson (May 10, 1933 – January 18, 2020) was an American actor. He was known for playing the role of Father Mike Fitzgerald in the American sitcom television series Bridget Loves Bernie.

Life and career 
Sampson was born in Los Angeles, California, the son of Roy Sampson. He began his career in 1954, as appearing in the television series Meet Corliss Archer. Sampson also guest-starred in numerous television programs including Gunsmoke, The Outer Limits (1963 TV series), Star Trek: The Original Series, Mission: Impossible, Bonanza, Dr. Kildare, Wonder Woman, Voyage to the Bottom of the Sea, Green Acres, Hawkins, The Jeffersons, and Police Story. He also appeared in films such as Re-Animator (as Dean Halsey), City of the Living Dead, Mr. Ricco, The Dark Side of the Moon, Robot Jox, The Sky's the Limit, Look in Any Window and Mad Dog Coll.

Later in his career, Sampson co-starred in the film The Restless Ones, in which he was in Minneapolis, Minnesota. He also co-starred in the CBS television series Bridget Loves Bernie, where Sampson played the role of Bridget Steinberg's priest-brother Father Mike Fitzgerald, in which the character Bridget Steinberg is played by Meredith Baxter. Sampson also played the recurring role of Sheriff Turk Tobias in the soap opera television series Falcon Crest. He was also a friend of actor Paul Trinka.

Death 
Sampson died in January 2020 in Santa Barbara, California, at the age of 86.

References

External links 

Rotten Tomatoes profile

1933 births
2020 deaths
People from Los Angeles
Male actors from Los Angeles
American male film actors
American male television actors
American male soap opera actors
Burials at Oakwood Memorial Park Cemetery
20th-century American male actors
21st-century American male actors
Western (genre) television actors